Maurice Le Lannou (8 May 1906 – 2 July 1992) was a French geographer.

1906 births
1992 deaths
École Normale Supérieure alumni
Academic staff of the Collège de France
French geographers
Members of the Académie des sciences morales et politiques
Commandeurs of the Ordre des Palmes Académiques
Officiers of the Légion d'honneur
20th-century geographers